Jason Alan Zucker (born January 16, 1992) is an American professional ice hockey left winger for the Pittsburgh Penguins of the National Hockey League (NHL).
 
Zucker played in the 2010 World Juniors for Team USA, winning a gold medal. He was also a member of Team USA's bronze medal-winning team at the 2011 World Juniors. Playing for the University of Denver in 2010–11, he was the Western Collegiate Hockey Association Rookie of the Year. He was drafted in the second round (59th overall) of the 2010 NHL Entry Draft by the Minnesota Wild.

Early life
Zucker was born in Newport Beach, California, and is Jewish. His mother, Natalie Zucker, is a former competitive figure skater, and his father, Scott Zucker, is a general contractor who built ice rinks and roller rinks when Jason was young. He has two older brothers, Evan and Adam, and a younger sister, Kimmie, and brother, Cameron.

When he was two months old, Zucker and his family moved to Las Vegas, Nevada. As a youth, he played in the 2004 and 2005 Quebec International Pee-Wee Hockey Tournaments with a minor ice hockey team from Los Angeles. He moved to Plymouth, Michigan, when he was 15 so he could play with the Compuware AAA Minor Midget Team, and finally to Ann Arbor, Michigan, for two years.

Zucker attended Pioneer High School in Ann Arbor, Michigan.

Zucker has multiple tattoos: on his back, "USA" (a nod to his playing for the national team); on his chest, "Game Time" (in memory of his best friend, Nick Scheafer, who died in 2010 at the age of 19 in a car accident); and on his left arm, written in Hebrew, "In pursuit of perfection" (in honor of his Jewish heritage). In 2016, he got a young cancer patient's name, who he met at Hockey Fights Cancer Awareness Night, tattooed onto his wrist, along with the words "shoot more" in memory of the boy who died on July 2, 2016.

Playing career

Early career
Zucker played in the 2009 World Juniors and 2010 World Juniors for Team USA, and won a gold medal in 2010. He was also a member of Team USA's bronze medal-winning team at the 2011 World Juniors.

Playing for the University of Denver in 2010–11, he was the Western Collegiate Hockey Association (WCHA) Rookie of the Year, and was also named to the WCHA All-Rookie Team and 2nd All-Star Team. In his two seasons playing for Denver, he had 45 goals and 91 points in 78 games. He turned pro following the 2011–12 season.

Professional career

Minnesota Wild
Zucker was drafted in the second round (59th overall) of the 2010 NHL Draft by the Minnesota Wild of the National Hockey League (NHL). He was the first Nevada-raised draft pick (and, subsequently, player) in NHL history. Zucker signed his entry-level contract with the Wild on March 27, 2012. He made his NHL debut in a victory against the Florida Panthers on March 29, 2012. He scored his first NHL goal against Petr Mrazek on February 17, 2013, in a Wild win over the Detroit Red Wings.

The lockout-shortened 2012–13 NHL season saw Zucker split time between the Minnesota Wild and the Houston Aeros. He appeared in 20 regular season games with Minnesota, and played mostly on the team's second line alongside Matt Cullen and Devin Setoguchi.

On May 5, 2013, Zucker scored at 2:15 of the extra period to give the Wild a 3–2 victory over the Chicago Blackhawks, to pull within 2–1 in the Western Conference quarterfinal series.

On March 26, 2014, Zucker underwent successful surgery on his left quadriceps to repair a tendon. He missed the remainder of the 2013–14 season, but was ready for the start of the 2014–15 campaign.

In 2014–15 he scored 21 goals in 51 games, and was tenth in the NHL with a 16.9% shooting percentage. On October 25, 2015, he set a Wild team record by scoring 10 seconds into a 5–4 win against the Winnipeg Jets (Zucker later tied his own record in a game against the Colorado Avalanche in April 2017). The only other NHL players who have scored within the first 10 seconds of two different games are Montreal's Bobby Rousseau (once in 1962–63, and once in 1965–66) and Yvan Cournoyer (both in 1973–74).

In 2015–16 he played in a career-high 71 games, and had 13 goals and 10 assists. In June 2016, the Wild re-signed him to a two-year, $4 million contract.

During the 2016–17 season, Zucker set new career highs once again by playing in 79 games while recording 22 goals and 25 assists for 47 points. He finished tied for sixth in team scoring.

Zucker recorded his first NHL hat-trick on November 9, 2017, against the Montreal Canadiens. On May 2, 2018, Zucker was named a finalist for the King Clancy Memorial Trophy, along with P. K. Subban, and the Sedin brothers.

On July 25, 2018, Zucker signed a five-year, $27.5 million contract extension with the Wild. Zucker scored his 100th NHL goal on October 13, 2018, in a home overtime loss against the Carolina Hurricanes. He is the seventh Minnesota Wild player to record 100 goals with the team.  Zucker received the 2018-19 King Clancy Memorial Trophy as "the player who best exemplifies leadership qualities on and off the ice and has made a noteworthy humanitarian contribution in his community."

In his career with the Wild, in 456 NHL games he had 132 goals (4th on the Wild's all-time list), 111 assists, and 243 points (9th).

Pittsburgh Penguins
On February 10, 2020, Zucker was traded by the Wild to the Pittsburgh Penguins in exchange for Alex Galchenyuk, Calen Addison, and a conditional first round pick in the 2020 NHL Entry Draft (condition within the trade later converted the pick to a first round pick in the 2021 NHL Entry Draft). Zucker is under contract with the Penguins for three years, through the 2022–23 season, for an average annual value of $5.5 million.

Personal life
Zucker married Minneapolis-based sports and entertainment journalist and television personality Carly Aplin in the summer of 2016. She is a television host for the Minnesota Timberwolves Entertainment Network (T.E.N.) and a reporter for CBS Sports and Fox Sports North, who in February 2018 premiered a sports talk radio show named "Overtime with Carly Zucker" on KFAN 100.3 FM. Jason and Carly have a son (Hendrix) and a daughter (Stella). The family lives in Edina, Minnesota.

Zucker is Jewish, though not religious. He did not have a bar mitzvah celebration because he never wanted to miss hockey; however, he does celebrate Hanukkah.

Career statistics

Regular season and playoffs

International

Awards and honors

See also
List of select Jewish ice hockey players

References

External links

Twitter

1992 births
American men's ice hockey left wingers
Denver Pioneers men's ice hockey players
Houston Aeros (1994–2013) players
Ice hockey players from California
Ice hockey people from Nevada
Iowa Wild players
Jewish American sportspeople
Jewish ice hockey players
King Clancy Memorial Trophy winners
Living people
Minnesota Wild draft picks
Minnesota Wild players
Pittsburgh Penguins players
Sportspeople from Las Vegas
Sportspeople from Edina, Minnesota
Sportspeople from Newport Beach, California
USA Hockey National Team Development Program players
21st-century American Jews
Ice hockey players from Minnesota
AHCA Division I men's ice hockey All-Americans